The Golden Spoon is a South Korean television series directed by Song Hyun-wook, and starring Yook Sung-jae, Lee Jong-won, Jung Chae-yeon, and Yeonwoo. Based on Naver hit webtoon of the same name by HD3 which was published in 2016, the series depicts a life adventure of a youth who became an acquired gold spoon. It premiered on MBC TV on September 23, 2022, and aired every Friday and Saturday at 21:50 (KST). It is also available for streaming on Disney+ in selected regions.

Synopsis
Lee Seung-cheon (Yook Sung-jae), a child born in a poor family, who changes fate with a friend who was born in a wealthy family through a golden spoon and becomes an acquired gold spoon.

Cast

Main
 Yook Sung-jae as Lee Seung-cheon
A student who dreams of turning his life around with a golden spoon.
 Jung Chae-yeon as Na Joo-hee
The daughter of a conglomerate family, who has a sense of righteousness and candid charm.
 Yeonwoo as Oh Yeo-jin
Lee Go-eun as young Oh Yeo-jin 
She has a pretty appearance and a bold personality, who grew up in a wealthy family.
 Lee Jong-won as Hwang Tae-yong
Who goes back and forth between the life of a gold spoon and a dirt spoon regardless of his will.

Supporting

People around Lee Seung-cheon
 Choi Dae-chul as Lee Cheol
Lee Seung-cheon's father.
 Han Chae-ah as Jin Seon-hye
Lee Seung-cheon's mother.
 Seungyoo as Lee Seung-ah 
Lee Seung-cheon's older sister.

People around Hwang Tae-yong
 Choi Won-young as Hwang Hyeon-do 
Hwang Tae-yong's father.
 Son Yeo-eun as Seo Young-shin
Hwang Tae-yong's stepmother.
 Jang Ryul as Seo Jun-tae 
Seo Young-shin's younger brother and the leader of Amicus, a secret social club of gold spoons.

People around Na Joo-hee
 Son Jong-hak as Na Sang-guk 
Na Joo-hee's father and UBS TV president. As a business owner, he values ​​profit and loss. But above all, he loved his daughter the most.

Others
 Kim Kang-min as Park Jang-goon 
He is the son of an army chief of staff with 200 billion won, and he has a bad taste to bully Lee Seung-cheon.
 Son Woo-hyun as Jang Mun-ki 
Hwang Tae-yong's bodyguard and driver.
 Kim Eun-soo as Lee Dong-kyung 
A close friend of Lee Seung-cheon.
 Jo  Deok-hoe as Park Jae-don
A lively and active person.
 Noh Sung-eun
 Lee In-hye as Writer Wang
 Song Ok-sook as Grandma Gem spoon
 Kim Seo-ha as Seong-won 
The second generation of a conglomerate, Seo Jun-tae's friend, and a member of Amicus.
 Song Yoo-hyun as Kim Na-young 
UBS TV President's House Custodian.
Jung Soo-kyo as Byun PD 
 is the main PD of Document Notebook.
 Lee Dong-hee as Alex Boo

Special appearance
 Na In-woo as Han Sung-hoon, a gardener in Hwang Tae-yong's house.
 Kim Jae-chul as Hwang Hyeon-do (real), Hwang Tae-yong's biological father.

Production

Casting
The main cast was confirmed on February 17, 2022.

Filming
On August 11, 2022, photos from the official script reading were published.

On September 12, 2022, it was confirmed by the agency that actress Jung Chae-yeon was diagnosed with a broken collarbone and was showing signs of trauma, and received emergency treatment while filming the drama.

She didn't attend the press conference for the drama on September 23 due to rehabilitation, and returned to filming on October 15, 2022.

Viewership

Awards and nominations

Notes

References

External links
  
 
 

2022 South Korean television series debuts
Korean-language television shows
MBC TV television dramas
Television series by Studio N (Naver)
Television series by Samhwa Networks
Television shows based on South Korean webtoons